Child sexual abuse laws in India have been enacted as part of the child protection policies of India. The Parliament of India passed the 'Protection of Children Against Sexual Offences Bill (POCSO), 2011' regarding child sexual abuse on 22 May 2012, making it an Act. A guideline was passed by the Ministry of Women and Child Development, India. The rules formulated by the government in accordance with the law had also been notified on the November 2012 and the law had become ready for implementation. There have been many calls for more stringent laws.

India has one of the largest population of children in the world. Census data from 2011 shows that India has a population of 472 million children below the age of eighteen. Protection of children by the state is guaranteed to Indian citizens by an expansive reading of Article 21 of the Indian constitution, and also mandated given India's status as signatory to the UN Convention on the Rights of the Child.

Laws Before the 2012 legislation was passed
Goa Children's Act, 2003, was the only specific piece of child abuse legislation before the 2012 Act. Child sexual abuse was prosecuted under the following sections of Indian Penal Code:
  I.P.C. (1860) 375- Rape
  I.P.C. (1860) 354- Outraging the modesty of a woman
  I.P.C. (1860) 377- Unnatural offences

However, the IPC could not effectively protect the child due to various loopholes like:
 IPC 375, does not protect male victims or anyone from sexual acts of penetration other than "traditional" peno-vaginal intercourse.
  IPC 354 lacks a statutory definition of "modesty". It carries a weak penalty and is a compoundable offence. Further, it does not protect the "modesty" of a male child.
  IPC 377, does not define the term "unnatural offences". It only applies to victims penetrated by their attacker's sex act, and is not designed to criminalise sexual abuse of children.

The Protection of Children from Sexual Offences Act, 2012

Offences under the Act 
The Protection of Children from Sexual Offences Act, 2012 was enacted to provide a robust legal framework for the protection of children from offences of sexual assault, sexual harassment and pornography, while safeguarding the interest of the child at every stage of the judicial process. The framing of the Act seeks to put children first by making it easy to use by including mechanisms for child-friendly reporting, recording of evidence, investigation and speedy trial of offences through designated Special Courts.

The New POCSO Act provides for a variety of offences under which an accused can be punished. It recognises forms of penetration other than penile-vaginal penetration and criminalises acts of immodesty against children too. Offences under the act include:
 Penetrative Sexual Assault: Insertion of penis/object/another body part in child's vagina/urethra/anus/mouth, or asking the child to do so with them or some other person
 Sexual Assault: When a person touches the child with sexual intent, or makes the child touch them or someone else 
 Sexual Harassment: passing sexually coloured remark, sexual gesture/noise, repeatedly following, flashing, etc.
 Child Pornography
 Aggravated Penetrative Sexual Assault/ Aggravated Sexual Assault

The act is gender-neutral for both children and for the accused. With respect to pornography, the Act criminalises watching or collection of pornographic content involving children also. The Act makes abetment(encouragement) of child sexual abuse an offence. After the 2019 amendment act, the POCSO Act punishment is even stricter. A violation of the POCSO Act carries a maximum punishment of life imprisonment and a fine.

Child-friendly process 
It also provides for various procedural reforms, making the tiring process of trial in India considerably easier for children. The Act has been criticised as its provisions seem to criminalise consensual sexual intercourse between two people below the age of 18.  The 2001 version of the Bill did not punish consensual sexual activity if one or both partners were above 16 years.

A Victim of Child Sexual Abuse can file a complaint at any time irrespective of his/her present age.

Child Welfare Committee 
A sexually abused child is considered as "child in need of care and protection" under Juvenile Justice (Care and Protection of Children) Act, 2015. Police officer should therefore inform the Child Welfare Committee about every case under the Act within 24 hours. CWC can appoint a support person for the child who will be responsible for psycho-social well-being of the child. This support person will also liaise with the police, and keep the child and child's family informed about progress in the case. Reporting can be done through toll free number 1098.

Contention around implementation of Protection of Children from Sexual Offences Act

Definition of child 
The Act defines a child as a person under the age of 18 years. However, this definition is a purely biological one, and does not take into account people who live with intellectual and psycho-social disability.

A recent case in SC had been filed where a woman, whose biological age was 38 years but her mental age was 6 years, was raped. The victim's advocate argued that "failure to consider the mental age will be an attack on the very purpose of act." SC  held that the Parliament has felt it appropriate that the definition of the term “age” by chronological age or biological age to be the safest yardstick, rather than referring to a person having mental retardation. The court said while awarding maximum compensation to a rape victim who is 38 years old with a mental maturity of 6 to 8 years but rejecting the plea that the victim's age should be taken not just in physical terms, but also take into account her mental age as well. The victim suffered from cerebral palsy.

Contradiction with the Medical Termination of Pregnancy Act, 1971 
The Protection of Children from Sexual Offences Act was passed to strengthen legal provisions for the protection of children below 18 years of age from sexual abuse and exploitation. Under this Act, if any girl under 18 is seeking abortion the service provider is compelled to register a complaint of sexual assault with the police. However, under the Medical Termination of Pregnancy Act, it is not mandatory to report the identity of the person seeking an abortion. Consequently, service providers are hesitant to provide abortion services to girls under 18.

Mandatory Reporting 
According to the Act, every crime of child sexual abuse should be reported. If a person who has information of any abuse fails to report, they may face imprisonment up to six months or may be fined or both. Many child rights and women rights organisations have criticised this provision. According to experts, this provision takes away agency of choice from children. There may be many survivors who do not want to go through the trauma of criminal justice system, but this provision does not differentiate. Furthermore, mandatory reporting may also hinder access to medical aid, and psycho-social intervention. It contradicts the right to confidentiality for access to medical, and psychological care.

Legal Aid 
Section 40 of the Act allows victims to access legal aid. However, that is subject to Code of Criminal Procedure. In other words, the lawyer representing a child can only assist the Public Prosecutor, and file written final arguments if the judge permits. Thus, the interest of the victim often go unrepresented.

Criminalisation of consensual relationships 
The law presumes that all sexual acts with children under the age of 18 is a sexual offence, this also includes sexual acts where both the individuals are under the age of 18. Therefore, two adolescents who engage in consensual sexual act will also be punished under this law, this coupled with the need for mandatory reporting has led to the criminalisation of consensual relationships between adolescents. This is especially a concern where an adolescent is in relationship with someone from different caste, or religion. Parents have filed cases under this Act to 'punish' relationships they do not approve of. In a 2015 analysis of 142 sexual assault cases in sessions courts of Mumbai, police were found misusing the act in 33 cases, by classifying women who were 18 years old as being between 15 and 18 years of age in their FIRs, in order to criminalise consenting relationships at the request of the parents of the girl.

Landmark Judgments under POCSO Act, 2012

Supreme Court of India  
 Sakshi v. Union of India 
 Independent Thought v. Union of India 
 Attorney General for India v. Satish and another (2021)
 Alakh Alok Srivastava v. Union of India and Others (2018)

Cases in News 
 Delta Meghwal rape case
 2017 Unnao Rape Case
 2021 Sexual Assault Rulings by (then) Judge Pushpa Virendra Ganediwala
 2014 Badaun gang rape allegations
 Muzaffarpur shelter case
 Kathua rape case
 2022 Hyderabad gang rape

Organisations working with victims of child sexual abuse 
 Aarambh India
 Childline India
 Tulir NGO
 HAQ Centre for child Rights

See also
Child sexual abuse
Law of India
Child Sexual Abuse in India
Ministry of Women and Child Development

References

External links
  Protection of Children Against Sexual Offences Bill, 2011

Child welfare in India
Laws
Sex laws in India
Sexual Abuse Laws